Calendula stellata is a species of flowering plant in the marigold genus Calendula, family Asteraceae. It is native to northwestern Africa, Malta, and Sicily. The Royal Horticultural Society considers it to be "highly attractive" and suitable for gardens in a Mediterranean climate.

References

stellata
Flora of Morocco
Flora of Algeria
Flora of Tunisia
Flora of Malta
Flora of Sicily
Plants described in 1791
Taxa named by Antonio José Cavanilles